Reinhold Glière wrote his Concerto for Harp and Orchestra in E-flat major, Op. 74, in 1938.

It lasts about 25 minutes and is in three movements:

 I. Allegro moderato in E-flat major
 II. Tema con variazioni in C-flat major
 III. Allegro giocoso in E-flat major

Glière sought the technical advice of the harpist Ksenia Alexandrovna Erdely (1878-1971).  She made so many suggestions that he offered to credit her as co-composer, but she declined.  The work was published as the work of Glière as edited by Erdely.

The music combines features that are redolent of both the Viennese classical style and Russian romantic nationalism.

Recordings

The Harp Concerto in E-flat has been recorded a number of times:
 Osian Ellis, London Symphony Orchestra, Richard Bonynge (1968)
 Olga Erdeli, Moscow Radio Large Symphony Orchestra, Boris Khaikin and Gennady Rozhdestvensky (1968)
 Catherine Michel, Luxembourg Radio/Television Symphony Orchestra, Louis de Froment  (1992)
 Rachel Masters, City of London Sinfonia, Richard Hickox (1993)
 Gretchen Van Hoesen, New Symphony Orchestra, Rossen Milanov (2002)
 Emmanuel Ceysson, Bavarian Radio Symphony Orchestra, Lawrence Renes (2009)
 Claire Jones, English Chamber Orchestra, Paul Watkins (2010)
 Beste Toparlak, Bilkent Symphony Orchestra, Isin Metin (2014)
 Xavier del Maistre, WDR Sinfonieorchester, Nathalie Stutzmann (2022)

See also
List of compositions for harp

References

Compositions by Reinhold Glière
Gliere
1938 compositions
Compositions in E-flat major